Muzaffarpur Janubi , is a village of Mianwali District in the Punjab province of Pakistan. The village serves as a Union Council (an administrative subdivision) of Mianwali Tehsil. The old name of this Village was Choor Wala, The Government Of Pakistan changed the name of this village From Choor Wala to Muzaffarpur (meaning village of Muzaffar) in the honor of khan Bahadar Malik Muzafar Khan Bhachar Ex MLA.

Muzaffarpur is an important UC of Mianwali and is located 22  km from Mianwali. Its population is 25,000. Malik Azeem Kundi is the nazim of  Muzafarpur. The village has a high school for boys and an elementary school for girls. The Inhabitants of this village are mostly zamindars consisting of the Bhachar Bandial clan.

Among the notable educated figures of Muzaffarpur Janubi is Prof. Farooq Abdullah who is M.Phil in English Literature and is an excellent fluent public speaker.

References

Union councils of Mianwali District
Populated places in Mianwali District